Angophora bakeri subsp. bakeri, commonly known as narrow-leaved apple, is a small to medium-sized tree that is endemic to New South Wales. It has rough bark on the trunk and branches, flower buds in groups of three or seven, white or creamy white flowers and cup-shaped to barrel-shaped fruit.

Description
It has rough, grey, softly fibrous bark on the trunk and branches. Flowering occurs from December to February.

Taxonomy and naming
Angophora bakeri was first formally described in 1913 by Edwin Cuthbert Hall and in 1986 Gregory John Leach described two subspecies in the journal Telopea, including the autonym, subspecies bakeri.

Distribution and habitat
This subspecies grows in sandy soil on sandstone is most common on the Central Coast of New South Wales, but there are disjunct populations north of Newcastle and as far south as Yalwal. There is also population, previously known as A. exul, in the Gibraltar Range National Park.

References

bakeri
Flora of New South Wales
Trees of Australia
Plants described in 1913